Events in the year 1981 in Turkey.

Incumbents
President – Kenan Evren
Prime Minister – Bülent Ulusu

Ruling party and the main opposition
  Ruling party – (Technocrat government)

Cabinet
44th government of Turkey

Events

January 
 17 January – Cargo ship Deniz Sönmez sinks near Crete, resulting in 32 fatalities.

March 
 4 March – Two Turkish diplomats assassinated by Armenian terrorists.

May 
 13 May – Assassination attempt on John Paul II by Mehmet Ali Ağca
 24 May – Trabzonspor won the championship of the Turkish football league

July 
 27 July – Turkey elects state artists for the first time.

October 
 16 October – NSC dissolves all political parties.
 23 October – Consultative Assembly inaugurated.

November 
 3 November – 3 November – Former prime minister Bülent Ecevit receives prison sentence for making political statements.
 30 November – Ministry of Culture merges with the Ministry of Tourism.

Births
10 January – Mert Fırat, actor
17 February – Songül Öden
34 March – Aysun Kayacı, model
27 October – Volkan Demirel, footballer
20 November – İbrahim Toraman, footballer

Deaths
4 March – Reşat Moralı and Tecelli Arı (assassinated)
18 March – Cahide Sonku (born in 1919), artist
27 April – Münir Nurettin Selçuk, singer
18 May – Fuat Sirmen (born in 1899), former speaker of the parliament
26 December – Suat Hayri Ürgüplü (born in 1903), former prime minister (29th government of Turkey)

Gallery

See also
1980–81 1.Lig
Turkey in the Eurovision Song Contest 1981

References

External links

 
Years of the 20th century in Turkey
Turkey
Turkey
Turkey